The National Academies Forum was replaced in May 2010 by the Australian Council of Learned Academies.

The National Academies Forum was established in 1995 as the peak organisation for the four Australian learned academies.  It represents:
 Academy of the Social Sciences in Australia
 Australian Academy of Science
 Australian Academy of Technological Sciences and Engineering
 Australian Academy of the Humanities

The current President is Prof. Stuart Macintyre, President of the Academy of the Social Sciences in Australia (ASSA).

The Forum is funded by a grant-in-aid from the Department of Education, Science and Training.

National Scholarly Communications Forum
The National Scholarly Communications Forum (NSCF) is an organisation, sponsored by the National Academies Forum, which organises events and conferences where issues pertaining to scholarly communication are discussed.

External links
 Website
 National Scholarly Communications Forum

1995 establishments in Australia
Learned societies of Australia
Australian National Academies